The 1987–88 Scottish League Cup was the forty-second season of Scotland's second football knockout competition. The competition was won by Rangers, who defeated Aberdeen in the Final.

First round

Second round

Third round

Quarter-finals

Semi-finals

Final

References

General

Specific

League
Scottish League Cup seasons